Faker are an Australian alternative rock band, formed in 1996 by mainstay Nathan Hudson on lead vocals, piano and guitar. They have released three studio albums, Addicted Romantic (June 2005), Be the Twilight (November 2007) and Get Loved (December 2011). Their highest charting single, "This Heart Attack" (2007), peaked at No. 9 on the ARIA Singles Chart. The group disbanded in December 2013, but they announced their reformation in October 2020.

History

1996-2004: Formation and early releases

Faker were formed in Sydney in 1996 by Andrew Day on drums, Chris Deal on guitar, Nathan Hudson on lead vocals, guitar and piano, and Paul Youdell on bass guitar. They were joined by Marco Fraietta ( Marco2000) on keyboards. The band spent five years performing gigs around Sydney. Their four-track debut extended play, Sound Out Loud, was released on 5 March 2001 via Wash Records/MGM Distribution with Greg Wales producing. Wash Records had been established by Hudson and the group's talent manager, Helen Chilman.

Marco2000 left Faker in 2000 after recording the EP, to relocate to France, while the band continued without a keyboardist. A single from the EP, "Teenage Werewolf", was placed on heavy rotation by Triple J and became a fan favourite. Another single, "Kids on Overload", followed in October 2001, which had Lindsay Stevenson on guitar. AllMusic's Chris True noted that "both [tracks] gained a fair amount of airplay on the radio network Triple J." Paul Berryman (ex-The Superjesus) replaced Day on drums late in 2003; Hudson described this as "the true beginning" for the band.

2005-2006:  Addicted Romantic 

They recorded their debut studio album, Addicted Romantic (June 2005), late in 2004 with Lindsay Gravina (Magic Dirt) producing at Birdland Studios, shortly after they had signed to Capitol Records. It is laden with sexual motifs, with Hudson explaining, "The first track on the record is about casual sex and confusion through sex". Rather than treat sex as "wrapped up in cotton wool", the band intended to be open, upfront, and aggressive in their discussion of the topic. Long-term bass guitarist Paul Youdell and guitarist Jonathan Wilson left the band after the studio sessions, and were replaced by Nicholas Munnings and Stefan Gregory, respectively. In May 2005, ahead of the album, they issued a five-track EP, The Familiar / Enough EP via EMI and Capitol Records, which had two tracks with Wilson and Youdell and the rest with Gregory and Munnings.

The album peaked at No. 44 on the ARIA Albums Chart. Three singles were released from the album: "The Familiar" (May 2005), "Hurricane" (October), and "Love for Sale" (March 2006). "The Familiar" reached No. 62 on the ARIA Singles Chart, while "Hurricane" peaked at No. 65. "Hurricane" was listed at No. 21 on the Triple J Hottest 100, 2005. The video for Hurricane was recorded in the Domed Reading Room of the State Library of Victoria. Addicted Romantic was nominated for the inaugural J Award, although it was won by Wolfmother. In 2006, Phil Downing left the band, citing communication problems with other members. After that point, the band's line-up of Hudson, Berryman, Gregory and Munnings, remained unchanged, until Berryman left in March 2008. He was replaced by Lucio Pedrazzi.

2007-2009: Be the Twilight
Faker's second album, Be the Twilight, was released on 17 November 2007. It peaked at No. 24 on the Australian ARIA Albums Chart. The first single from the album, "This Heart Attack", was released on 27 October 2007. The song peaked at No. 9 on the Australian ARIA Singles Chart, and it also reached No. 5 on the Triple J Hottest 100, 2007. The second single, "Are You Magnetic?", was released on 12 July 2008.

Be the Twilight was recorded in Los Angeles with producer Paul Fox (XTC, Björk, The Sugarcubes, They Might Be Giants). The band wrote 45 songs for the album before traveling to Los Angeles, where they trimmed this down to 12. The songs were influenced by the band's surroundings at the time of recording, with Hudson stating "[t]here's a whole directness that exists in L.A. and I kind of feel that we put that in the record". Hudson said that after "putting all the things you've ever experienced" into Addicted Romantic, the band were able to record Be the Twilight  "more in the moment." Be the Twilight took its name from Hudson's fear of the dark; Faker insisted they "name the album after the twilight just to annoy him". Following the release of Be the Twilight, Faker embarked on an album tour, playing with fellow bands Children Collide and E.L.F. The tour commenced on 15 November 2007.

Critics generally responded well to Be the Twilight. Triple J rated it highly, stating the band "has made a record that will instantly please fans". Likewise, Webcuts Music awarded it 4.5 (out of five) saying "Faker are one of the few exciting and honest, heart-on-sleeve acts that exist in Australia. Be the Twilight is almost perfection". FHM saw it as "less annoying" than Addicted Romantic, and gave it 3 stars.

In 2008, the band appeared in major slots at a number of Australian outdoor festivals, and toured extensively.

In early 2009, the band joined Pink on the Australian Funhouse Tour dates.

2010-2013: Get Loved and disbandment
The band released several demos via SoundCloud over the end of 2010 and announced on their Facebook page that the new album would be called Get Loved. On 25 May, the CSS remix of their new single "Dangerous" was released on SoundCloud via their Facebook page.

Intended for release in January 2012, the band decided to release Get Loved for free in December 2011 instead.

In 2013, frontman Nathan Hudson announced the band had broken up.

2020-present: Reformation 
In October 2020, Faker announced on their Facebook page that they would be reforming.

Members 
Current members
 Nathan Hudson – lead vocals, guitar, piano (1996–2013, 2020–present)

Current touring musicians
 Ben Fletcher – guitar, backing vocals (2022–present)
 B.K. Ayala – guitar (2022–present)
 Courtney Cunningham – bass, backing vocals (2022–present)
 Astrid Holz – drums (2022–present)

Past members
 Andrew Day – drums (1996–2003)
 Chris Deal – guitar (1996–2001)
 Paul Youdell – bass guitar (1996–2004)
 Marco Fraietta ( Marco2000) – keyboards (1996–2000)
 Lindsay Stevenson – guitar (2001)
 Jonathan Wilson – guitar (2001–2004)
 Paul Berryman – drums (2003–2008)
 Stefan Gregory – guitar (2004–2008)
 Philip Downing – guitar, backing vocals (2004–2006)
 Nicholas Munnings – bass guitar (2004–2013, 2020)

Former touring musicians
 Liam O'Brien
 Daniel Wright
 Chris Stabback
 Damien Cassidy
 Lucio Pedrazzi
 Flynn Scully
 Ash Moss
 Evan Mannell
 Mark Quince
 Ben Blackhall
 Seamus Byrne
 Simon Barbetti

Discography

Studio albums

EPs

Singles

Music videos

Awards and nominations

APRA Awards

! 
|-
| 2009 || "This Heart Attack" || Most Played Australian Work ||  || 
|}

ARIA Music Awards
The ARIA Music Awards are a set of annual ceremonies presented by Australian Recording Industry Association (ARIA), which recognise excellence, innovation, and achievement across all genres of the music of Australia. They commenced in 1987. 

! 
|-
| 2008 || Be the Twilight || ARIA Award for Best Rock Album ||  || 
|}

J Award
The J Awards are an annual series of Australian music awards that were established by the Australian Broadcasting Corporation's youth-focused radio station Triple J. They commenced in 2005.

|-
| J Award of 2005
| Addicted Romantic
| Australian Album of the Year
| 
|-

References

External links

 Official website
 Faker music video Sleepwalking

 
APRA Award winners
Australian indie rock groups
Capitol Records artists
Musical groups established in 1996
Musical groups from Sydney